Monserrato (Pauli or Paulli in Sardinian language) is a comune (municipality) in the Metropolitan City of Cagliari, southern Sardinia, Italy, located about  northeast of Cagliari.

Monserrato borders the following municipalities: Cagliari, Quartu Sant'Elena, Quartucciu, Selargius, Sestu. Sights include the Gothic church of Sant'Ambrogio.

History
In the Middle Ages, the village was known as Pauli (Sardinian language for marsh), and was part of the Giudicato of Cagliari. Later owned by the Republic of Pisa, the House of Aragon and the Giudicato of Arborea, it was depopulated by plague in 1348. Later it was a Spanish and then Savoyard fief.

Monserrato was an autonomous commune until 1928, when it was annexed to Cagliari. It remained a district of the latter until 1991, when it was separated with a local referendum. Since 1995  the town has been part of the newly instituted Cagliari metropolitan area.

References

External links 

 Official website

Cities and towns in Sardinia
Geography of Cagliari
1991 establishments in Italy
States and territories established in 1991
States and territories disestablished in 1928